Mossoró is a microregion in the Brazilian state of Rio Grande do Norte.

Municipalities 
The microregion consists of the following municipalities:
 Areia Branca
 Baraúna
 Grossos
 Mossoró
 Serra do Mel
 Tibau

References

Microregions of Rio Grande do Norte